Harris Walter Fawell (March 25, 1929 – November 11, 2021) was an American politician from Illinois who served as a Republican member of the United States House of Representatives from 1985 to 1999.

Early life and career
Fawell was a graduate of West Chicago High School. He attended North Central College of Naperville 1947–1949 and received his LL.B from Chicago-Kent College of Law. Admitted to the bar in 1952, Fawell practiced law from 1954 to 1984. He served as an Assistant State Attorney for DuPage County, Illinois. He was the brother-in-law of Beverly Fawell, who was a member of both Houses of the Illinois General Assembly.

Illinois Senate
In 1958, Fawell challenged incumbent Lottie Holman O'Neill in the Republican primary to represent the 41st district in the Illinois Senate, but was unsuccessful. Four years later, he was elected to succeed her when she retired. He was a Republican member of the Illinois Senate from 1963 to 1977, and was a delegate to the Republican National Conventions in 1968 and 1988. In the 1976 Republican primary for the Illinois Supreme Court, Appellate Judge Thomas J. Moran defeated Fawell.

Congress
In 1984 he was elected to the U.S. House of Representatives, representing Illinois' 13th district where he served until he retired in 1999. The Harris W. Fawell Congressional Papers are held at North Central College.

Post-political life
He served on the North Central College Board of Trustees and on the Executive Council of the Chicago Metropolis 2020 of Chicago. In 2008, Fawell endorsed his home state's junior United States Senator Barack Obama for President of the United States, against his party's nominee, Arizona senator John McCain.

Fawell died of complications from Alzheimer's disease on November 11, 2021.

References

External links

1929 births
2021 deaths
People from West Chicago, Illinois
Republican Party Illinois state senators
Illinois lawyers
North Central College alumni
Chicago-Kent College of Law alumni
Republican Party members of the United States House of Representatives from Illinois
Deaths from Alzheimer's disease
Neurological disease deaths in Illinois
Members of Congress who became lobbyists